Deh-e Kulak (also Romanized as Deh-e Kūlak; also known as Deh Kalak) is a village in Rameshk Rural District, Chah Dadkhoda District, Qaleh Ganj County, Kerman Province, Iran. At the 2006 census, its population was 253, in 60 families.

References 

Populated places in Qaleh Ganj County